Ankhiyon Ke Jharokhon Se is a 1978 Indian Hindi-language drama film, starring Ranjeeta and Sachin and directed by Hiren Nag. It was produced and distributed by Rajshri Productions and showcased music by Ravindra Jain. 

The film was a blockbuster at the box office, earning 4.5 times of its budget. It was 18th highest grossing movie in India in 1978. The title song of the movie was also hugely popular. The film was shot in Mumbai and other locations in India. A sequel to the film called Jaana Pehchana was released in 2011, but was panned by critics compared to the original.

The film was shot in Bhavans College, Andheri W, and Mumbai.

Plot
Arun (Sachin), the son of a barrister and the self-proclaimed "prince" of the male students, finds his pride and huge ego crushed when he stands second in the Terminal Examination. He loses to Lily Fernandes (Ranjeeta), a modest daughter of a nurse in a private nursing home. Arun takes this as a defeat, and decides to nurse a personal vendetta to try and crush Lily's growing popularity in school. Lily, however, tolerates him and his friends' remarks and sarcasm as she bears no grudge against him.

As time goes on, they gradually discover the basic qualities of each other, and become admirers. They visit beautiful places together on weekends to get to know each other better. Lily's mother (Urmila Bhatt) is the first person to notice the love blossoming between her daughter and Arun. She is worried, because even though Arun is madly in love with her daughter, she fears the consequences of their social status differences. Despite this, Arun's father (Madan Puri) approves and presents a proposal to Lily's mother to allow their children to marry.
 
When everything is going well, Lily falls ill and is discovered to have leukemia. Even though Lily and Arun act as if nothing was wrong, everyone tries to save her. Everything seems fine for a while, but Lily's condition grows worse. She dies in Arun's arms, leaving him devastated. Arun goes to same college where they studied, and mourns for Lily. The film ends with Arun on the seaside, promising Lily that he will never forget her and that she was an inspiration in his life and will always remain to be.

Cast
 Sachin Pilgaonkar as Arun Prakash Mathur
 Ranjeeta Kaur as Lily Fernandes
 Madan Puri as Arun's father
 Iftekhar as Dr. Pradhan
 Urmila Bhatt as Ruby Fernandes
 Harindranath Chattopadhyay as Mr. Rodrigues
 Master Raju

Awards 

 26th Filmfare Awards:

Nominated

 Best Film – Rajshri Productions
 Best Actress – Ranjeeta Kaur
 Best Music Director – Ravindra Jain
 Best Lyricist – Ravindra Jain for "Ankhiyon Ke Jharokhon Se"
 Best Female Playback Singer – Hemlata for "Ankhiyon Ke Jharokhon Se"

Soundtrack
Ravindra Jain composed the music and wrote the songs for this movie. The songs have been quite popular, especially the title song, "Ankhiyon Ke Jharokhon Se".  Ravindra Jain was nominated for Filmfare Awards in two categories for this song, namely, Best Lyricist and Best Musician.

The song/tune of 'Kai din se mujhe' has very strong resemblance to Mozart's 40th Symphony Movement 3.

Sequel
In 2011 Rajshri Productions produced a sequel for Ankhiyon Ke Jharokhon Se featuring Sachin Pilgaonkar and Ranjeeta Kaur of the original cast. The sequel was called Jaana Pehchana and showcased Arun's life after Lily’s death. Ranjeeta Kaur portrayed a new character who is a look-alike of Lily. The film was released on 16 September 2011.

Reception
The film was nominated for Best Actress, Best Film, and Best Direction at the 1978 Filmfare Awards. Ranjeeta's poignant portrayal of Lily was critically acclaimed.

References

External links

1978 films
1970s Hindi-language films
1978 romantic drama films
Films scored by Ravindra Jain
Rajshri Productions films
Films directed by Hiren Nag
Indian interfaith romance films
Indian films about cancer